The Herbert River is a river located in Far North Queensland, Australia. The southernmost of Queensland's wet tropics river systems, it was named in 1864 by George Elphinstone Dalrymple explorer, after Robert George Wyndham Herbert, the first Premier of Queensland.

Location and features
The Herbert River flows in a generally southeastern direction through the Lumholtz National Park joined by fifteen tributaries including the Stone River and flowing past the town of Ingham. The river descends  over its  course.

The Herbert River tributaries include the Blunder, Sunday and Cameron Creeks, which all rise in the Cardwell Range and drain the northern portion of the river's catchment area, upstream of the Herbert River Falls. Further south the catchment is drained by the Nanyeta (Return) and Rudd Creeks, which flow out of the Great Dividing Range west of Mount Garnet and from the Forty Mile Scrub area.

The Wallaman Falls on Stony Creek, another tributary of the Herbert, are Australia's tallest single-drop waterfall. Other waterfalls on the river include Herbert River Falls, Blencoe Falls and Millstream Falls.

The river experienced significant flooding during the 2010–11 Queensland floods.

People and land use
Warrgamay (also known as Waragamai, Wargamay, Wargamaygan, Biyay, and Warakamai) is an Australian Aboriginal language in North Queensland. The language region includes the Herbert River area, Ingham, Hawkins Creek, Long Pocket, Herbert Vale, Niagara Vale, Yamanic Creek, Herbert Gorge, Cardwell, Hinchinbrook Island and the adjacent mainland.

Warungu (also known as Warrungu, Warrongo, and Waroongoo.) is an Australian Aboriginal language in North Queensland. The language region includes areas from the Upper Herbert River to Mount Garnet.

The catchment area holds a population of about 18,000, 75% of whom dwell in the lower flood plain area.

The river's upper region is used mainly for cattle grazing, while the lower Herbert River floodplain is given over to sugar cane production. The middle reaches of the catchment include National Parks, State Forests and sections of the Wet Tropics World Heritage Area.

Parts of the river, especially the Herbert River Gorge stretch, are used for kayaking and white water rafting. The Herbert River is one of Australia's two finest extended whitewater journeys, the other the Franklin River in Tasmania.

The second season of the U.S. reality television series, Survivor, was filmed on the "Goshen" cattle station in the upper Herbert River region, near the Blencoe Falls and Herbert River Gorge.

The Herbert, together with the Tully and the Burdekin rivers, were part of the proposed Bradfield Scheme to divert the upper reaches of the three rivers west of the Great Dividing Range and into the Thomson River designed to irrigate and drought-proof much of the western Queensland interior, as well as large areas of South Australia. The Scheme was proposed in 1938 and abandoned in 1947.

See also

 List of rivers of Queensland

References

External links
 About the Herbert River Catchment
 
 
 

Rivers of Far North Queensland
North Queensland
Floods in Queensland
Bodies of water of the Coral Sea